Gymnobathra origenes is a species of moth in the family Oecophoridae. This species is in need of taxonomic revision and it has been hypothesised that it belongs to the family Gelechiidae. The species is endemic to New Zealand. It has been classified as Data Deficient by the Department of Conservation. This species is known from only one specimen.

Taxonomy 
This species was first described by Edward Meyrick in 1936 using a specimen collected by Stewart Lindsay from Mount St Arnaud at approximately 1200m. George Hudson discussed and illustrated this species in his 1928 publication The Butterflies and Moths of New Zealand. The holotype is held at the Canterbury Museum.

The genus level classification of this species is regarded as unsatisfactory. However, as this species is only known from a single specimen that has lost its abdomen this issue is currently unresolved. As such the species is also known as Gymnobathra (s.l.) origenes. It has been hypothesised that the genus this species belongs is in the family Gelechiidae.

Description 
Edward Meyrick described this species as follows:

Distribution 
G. origenes is endemic to New Zealand. It only known from the Saint Arnaud Range.

Biology and behaviour 
The adult moths are on the wing in December.

Conservation status 
This species has been classified as having the "Data Deficient" conservation status under the New Zealand Threat Classification System.

References

External links
Image of holotype

Moths described in 1936
Oecophoridae
Moths of New Zealand
Endemic fauna of New Zealand
Taxa named by Edward Meyrick
Endemic moths of New Zealand